Prism is the first album recorded by Japanese jazz guitarist Ryo Kawasaki after he moved to New York City from Tokyo.

At the time of this recording, he was a member of the Gil Evans Orchestra, Elvin Jones Jazz Machine, Chico Hamilton group, and Tarika Blue. Musicians on this album are from these groups. Herb Bushler was a member of the Gil Evans Orchestra, Abdulha and Steve Turre from the Chico Hamilton group, and Phil Clendeninn from Tarika Blue. Buddy Williams was a member of George Benson's group and often played with Kawasaki in New York City. Prism was recorded in one afternoon and mixed the next day.

Track listing

Personnel
 Ryo Kawasaki – electric guitar
 Phil Clendeninn – Fender Rhodes electric piano, Hohner D6 Clavinet, ARP Odyssey and ARP String Ensemble synthesizers
 Herb Bushler – bass guitar
 Buddy Williams – drums
 Abdulah – congas, percussion
 Steve Turre – shell, percussion
 David Baker – engineer

References

External links
 Discogs
 sudo.3.pro.tok2

1975 albums
East Wind Records albums